Anisa (Ανίσα) was a town of ancient Cappadocia, inhabited in Hellenistic, Roman, and Byzantine times. A source described Anisa as a politeumata, which was a township for privileged foreigners. Although it did not control any territory outside its jurisdiction, it enjoyed internal self-government. 

Its site is located at Kültepe, Kayseri Province in Asiatic Turkey. A second or first century BCE bronze tablet originating from this settlement revealed that Anisa was a prosperous city. It contained the names of officials (e.g. archons, prytaneis, and demiourgos) as well as various institutions (e.g. boule, ecclesia). The tablet, which was said to be stored at the city's temple of Astarte, also commemorated an act by the Cappadocian king Ariarathes granting the citizens of Anisa a new constitution.

References

Populated places in ancient Cappadocia
Former populated places in Turkey
Populated places of the Byzantine Empire
Roman towns and cities in Turkey
History of Kayseri Province